Douglas Scott (4 December 1926 – 1996) was the pen name of Douglas Smith, a British author of thriller fiction, mostly published during the 1980s.  His subject periods run from the theatres of the Second World War to post war Europe. A number of his novels feature seagoing prominently and he sometimes get categorised as an author of naval fiction.

Scott was born in Broughty Ferry, Scotland on 4 December 1926. He died in 1996.

Bibliography
The Spoils of War – Secker & Warburg, London, 1977 
The Gifts of Artemis – Secker & Warburg, London, 1979 
 (the above was retitled Operation Artemis, Bobbs-Merrill, Indianapolis, 1979  in the USA)
The Burning of the Ships – Secker & Warburg, London, 1980 
Die for the Queen – Secker & Warburg, London, 1981 
In the Face of the Enemy – Secker & Warburg, London, 1982 
The Hanged Man – Secker & Warburg, London, 1983 
Chains – Secker & Warburg, London, 1984 
Eagle's Blood – Secker and Warburg, London, 1985 
The Albatross Run – Secker & Warburg, London, 
Shadows – Secker & Warburg, London, 1987 
Whirlpool – Century, London, 1988

Notes

External links

1926 births
1996 deaths
Thriller writers